The Trofimov Beheadings was a mass murder committed in 2012 in Ukraine, in which a judge and his family were beheaded with a machete. The judge, Vladimir Trofimov, his wife Irina, their son Sergei, and the son's girlfriend were attacked in the eastern Ukraine city of Kharkiv on December 15, 2012. The judge was attacked at his family home. The bodies were all left at the scene, minus their heads. It was reported the judge, his wife, and son's partner were killed first, then beheaded, while the son was beheaded while still alive.

Investigation
Police stated that the motive for the murders was either revenge or theft. Trofimov, 58, had worked as a magistrate and judge for more than 30 years, and was a noted antiques collector. The attack came on a celebration day for judges in Ukraine. The case was described as one of the most shocking to emerge from the new European state in the international media, with many commentators using the case to spotlight the flawed Ukrainian judicial system.

See also
List of unsolved murders

References

2012 murders in Ukraine
Deaths by blade weapons
December 2012 crimes
Family murders
Mass murder in 2012
Unsolved mass murders
Unsolved murders in Ukraine
2010s in Kharkiv